Joseph Miller (birth unknown – death unknown) was an English professional rugby league footballer who played in the 1900s and 1910s.

Playing career

International honours
Joe Miller won caps for England while at Wigan in 1909 against Australia, in 1910 against Wales, in 1911 against Wales, and won a cap for Great Britain while at Wigan in 1911 against Australia.

Championship final appearances
Joe Miller played , i.e. number 5, in Wigan's 7–3 victory over Oldham in the Championship Final during the 1908–09 season at The Willows, Salford on Saturday 1 May 1909.

County League appearances
Joe Miller played in Wigan's victories in the Lancashire County League during the 1908–09 season, 1910–11 season, 1911–12 season, 1912–13 season, 1913–14 season and 1914–15 season.

County Cup Final appearances
Joe Miller played , i.e. number 5, and scored 2-tries in Wigan's 10–9 victory over Oldham in the 1908 Lancashire County Cup Final during the 1908–09 season at Wheater's Field, Broughton, on Saturday 19 December 1908, and played , and scored 2-tries in the 22–5 victory over Leigh in the 1909 Lancashire County Cup Final during the 1909–10 season at Wheater's Field, Broughton, on Saturday 27 November 1909.

Notable tour matches
Joe Miller played , i.e. number 5, in Wigan's 12–8 victory over New Zealand in the 1907–1908 New Zealand rugby tour of Australia and Great Britain match at Central Park, Wigan, on Saturday 9 November 1907, played  in the 10–7 victory over Australia in the 1908–09 Kangaroo tour of Great Britain match at Central Park, Wigan, on Saturday 9 January 1909, played  in the 16–8 victory over Australia in the 1908–09 Kangaroo tour of Great Britain match at Central Park, Wigan, on Wednesday 20 January 1909, and played  in the 7–2 victory over Australia in the 1911–12 Kangaroo tour of Great Britain match at Central Park, Wigan, on Saturday 28 October 1911.

References

External links
Statistics at wigan.rlfans.com

England national rugby league team players
English rugby league players
Great Britain national rugby league team players
Place of birth missing
Place of death missing
Rugby league players from Wigan
Rugby league wingers
Wigan Warriors players
Year of death missing
1884 births